The Fortune Hunter is a lost 1920 silent film comedy directed by Tom Terriss. It is based on a 1909 stage play by Winchell Smith. It stars Earle Williams and Jean Paige and was produced by the Vitagraph Company of America.

Cast
Earle Williams – Nathaniel Dunham
Jean Paige – Betty Graham
Van Dyke Brooke – Sam Graham
Nancy Lee – Josie Lockwood
William Holden – Banker Lockwood
Charles Trowbridge – Harry Kellogg
Frank Norcross – Sheriff Pete Willing
Billy Hoover – Tracey
Louise Lee – Angie
Earl Metcalfe – Roland Barnett

References

External links

1920 films
American silent feature films
Lost American films
Films directed by Tom Terriss
Vitagraph Studios films
American black-and-white films
Silent American comedy films
1920 comedy films
1920 lost films
Lost comedy films
1920s American films